João Paulo Moreira Fernandes (born 26 May 1998) is a Cape Verdean footballer who plays as a winger for Portuguese club Feirense and the Cape Verde national team.

International career
Fernandes was called up to the Cape Verde national team for a pair of friendlies in June 2021. He debuted with the Cape Verde national team in a friendly 2–0 loss to Senegal on 8 June 2021.

References

External links
 
 

1998 births
Living people
People from Santo Antão, Cape Verde
Cape Verdean footballers
Cape Verde international footballers
Association football wingers
Sporting Clube da Praia players
Leça F.C. players
C.D. Feirense players
Cape Verdean National Championships players
Campeonato de Portugal (league) players
Liga Portugal 2 players
Cape Verdean expatriate footballers
Cape Verdean expatriates in Portugal
Expatriate footballers in Portugal
2021 Africa Cup of Nations players